Heavyweight is a Gimlet Media podcast created and produced by humorist Jonathan Goldstein where he helps people try to resolve a moment from their past that they wish they could change.

Goldstein told The New Yorker that the name "Heavyweight" is meant to suggest the emotional burdens that we carry around, as well as "the connotation of the boxer juxtaposed with the connotation of me . . . the non-boxer.”

Podcast format 
In each episode, host Jonathan Goldstein attempts to help a guest—typically an ordinary person, not a celebrity—find closure for an unresolved question in their lives. The New York Times described it this way: "Jonathan Goldstein climbs inside the stories that shape people’s lives to see if he can help them create better endings." The Atlantic described the podcast by saying, "Each episode finds the host Jonathan Goldstein moderating a fraught moment intensified by years of distance: a time when someone broke a promise, or another person’s heart. The hurt is still there—sometimes for everyone, sometimes for just one person who can’t let something go. Goldstein leads special-ops soul-searching missions, seeking common ground between the aggrieved and the blissfully ignorant."

As described in the Financial Times: "The first episode featured Goldstein’s 80-year-old father, Buzz, and his estranged brother. When he got them talking you could feel the temperature plummet. The second episode revolved around Goldstein’s friend Gregor, who once loaned the pop musician Moby a box of CDs. In this collection, Moby found the songs that he sampled for his mega-selling 1999 album, Play. Now Gregor wanted his CDs back, along with the life he thought he could have had."

The show's absurd yet earnest tone has been compared to that of Dr. Katz, Professional Therapist. In his role as host, Goldstein has been described as "Louis Theroux without the gaucheness" and a dry commentator whose willingness to "crack mean jokes...saves the podcast from ever becoming saccharine."

Reception 
Heavyweight has been positively reviewed in The New York Times, The New Yorker, The Atlantic, and The Guardian, which described one episode as a "toe-curling delight". Writing in the Financial Times, Fiona Sturges called the show "terrifically moving". In The Atlantic, Laura Jane Standley wrote: "As Goldstein presides over these thorny divisions, he injects the narrative with a buddy-cop mania, letting the listeners laugh at how flawed his subjects (himself included) are, without ever being demeaning".

The New Yorker wrote: "With gumption, empathy, and comic awkwardness, [Goldstein] ventures into people’s lives and tries to help them resolve things from the past: an unsolved human mystery, lingering guilt, a falling-out, hurt that’s turned to grievance." The Guardian wrote: "Goldstein leads his subjects back to that crucial moment when things went wrong and then helps them confront it so they can move on. Enthralling."

Heavyweight was named the Number One podcast of 2016 by The Atlantic and one of the best podcasts of 2019 by The Economist.

The show spent 4 days at #1 on the US iTunes podcast charts in September 2016, following its series premiere. In Canada, the show was at #1 for thirteen days and the show has spent nearly three times as many days in the top 100 there as it did in the US.

Awards 
The Third Coast International Audio Festival gave the episode "Gregor" the TC/RHDF 2017 Skylarking Award in 2017. The episode was produced by Jonathan Goldstein, Chris Neary, Wendy Dorr and Kalila Holt.

In 2020, “The Marshes” episode(#30) was nominated for an IDA Documentary award for best audio documentary.

Series overview

References

External links
 

Audio podcasts
2016 podcast debuts
Gimlet Media
American podcasts